This list is of national parks in Dominica.  For national parks in the similarly named country of the Dominican Republic, see List of national parks of the Dominican Republic.
There are three National parks in Dominica. Other protected areas include two Forest Reserves and the Syndicate Parrot Preserve.

National parks

Other protected areas

External links
.

Dominica
 
National parks
National parks